Edi Orioli (born 5 December 1962 in Udine) is an Italian rallying motorcycle racer.

Many consider Orioli to be one of the best motorcyclists in rallying, with four victories in the Dakar Rally, and one victory in the Pharaoh Rally, and was considered a great motorcyclist before commencing a career in automobile racing.

Honours
 Won Dakar Rally 1988, 1990, 1994, 1996; placed 2nd in 1987, and 3rd in 1995
 Won Pharaoh Rally 1993

External links
 Official web site 

1962 births
Living people
Sportspeople from Udine
Italian motorcycle racers
Off-road motorcycle racers
Dakar Rally motorcyclists
Dakar Rally winning drivers

Nürburgring 24 Hours drivers
Italian racing drivers